Caroline Attia (born 4 July 1960) is a French former alpine skier who competed in the 1980 Winter Olympics and 1984 Winter Olympics.

External links
 sports-reference.com

1960 births
Living people
French female alpine skiers
Olympic alpine skiers of France
Alpine skiers at the 1980 Winter Olympics
Alpine skiers at the 1984 Winter Olympics
Universiade medalists in alpine skiing
Universiade gold medalists for France
Competitors at the 1978 Winter Universiade